Kitts is an English surname. It is also an anglicized version of the German surname Götz. Notable people with the surname include:

 Derrick Kitts (born  1973), Republican politician from Hillsboro in the U.S. state of Oregon
 Frank Kitts (1912–1979), Mayor of Wellington, New Zealand
 Isaac Kitts (1896–1953), American horse rider 
 James Kitts (1900–1952), American football, basketball, and baseball player and coach
 Jim Kitts (born 1972), former American football running back 
 Miles Brown Kitts (1880–1947), Republican mayor of Erie, Pennsylvania 
 Wesley Kitts (born 1990), American weightlifter, Olympian

See also
 Kitt (surname)
 Götz

References

External links
  John Kitts (Götz)
  Kitts Coat of Arms

English-language surnames